Haroon Rashid Aswat (born  in Britain) is a British citizen of South Asian origin with ancestral ethnic roots to Gujarat, born and raised in Yorkshire. American officials allege that he has ties to al Qaeda, and have sought his extradition to the United States, which is supported by the British Government. After his internment in Broadmoor Hospital in 2008, in 2010 the European Court of Human Rights blocked efforts to extradite Aswat due to concerns over the conditions of his potential imprisonment in the United States. This decision was upheld on 11 September 2013, meaning that he can not be extradited while under treatment for paranoid schizophrenia.

Early life
Haroon Rashid Aswat, a British Gujarati Muslim, was born in the UK in 1979 (some sources quote dates as early as 1974), to a South Asian family, and was raised in Dewsbury, West Yorkshire. Upon leaving school, he moved to Wood Green, London.

Activities
From 1995 he became associated with Abu Hamza al-Masri and the Finsbury Park Mosque. There, he helped to organise 200 British-based men of Pakistani origin to engage in terrorism in Jammu and Kashmir. The group later deployed to Bosnia to join Abdelkader Mokhtari's new battalion Harkat ul-Ansar, based in Zenica.

In 1999 together with Abu Hamza and American-born convert James Ujaama, the three attempted to buy land in Oregon, United States to build a training camp for young Muslims. During this period Aswat lived in Seattle, Washington for over a month, and it is alleged that he was an MI6 informant.

After the project failed, he began a period of travel around the world. By 2002 he was at a religious school in Lahore, hosted by Mohammed al-Ghabra. In November 2004 he met in Pakistan with the ringleader of the London 7/7 attack, Mohammad Sidique Khan, and accomplice Shehzad Tanweer.

By late 2004/early 2005 Aswat was resident in South Africa. US authorities tried to extradite him with regards the Oregon camp project, but as he was a British Citizen who had committed no crimes in South Africa, the South African authorities refused the extradition request. After the London 7/7 bombings, local South African newspapers reported that Aswat had been living a quiet life there for at least five months. Neighbors and co-workers described Aswat as "a family man" and said that he showed no apparent interest in radical Islamic politics.

In late June 2005 he arrived in the UK, through the Port of Felixstowe. He then left again via Heathrow Airport on 7 July 2005 for India, hours before the July 2005 London bombings.

Allegations of terrorism
American counter-terrorism officials state that they began investigating Aswat in 2002. In reporting on Oussama Kassir's 2009 trial Oregon Live described Lebanese-born Swedish militant Kassir and Aswat taking a bus from the east coast to Oregon. According to The Sunday Herald, by 1999, Aswat was calling himself a "hit man" for bin Laden. 

American and British counter-terrorism officials stated that they found Aswat's passport on a man killed in action in Afghanistan in early 2003, and believed him to be Aswat.

In the first two weeks following the 7 July 2005 bombings, police sources initially told newspapers that Aswat made some 20 mobile phone calls to two of the suspected bombers just hours before the blasts. On 31 July 2005, following a more thorough forensic analysis of the remains of the bombers' phones,  The Times reported that: "British investigators, examining whether telephone calls were made between the London bombers and Aswat before the attacks of 7/7, caution that the calls may have been made to a phone linked to Aswat, rather than the man himself."

The New York Times quoted unnamed security officials that when Aswat's presence was brought to the attention of American authorities, that they wanted to subject him to an extraordinary rendition.
The New York Times sources said British officials objected, stating that "He's got U.K. papers, and they said you can't render somebody with U.K. papers."

On 29 July 2005, during an interview on Fox News a former US prosecutor named John Loftus, asserted that Aswat was a double agent, backed by MI6. Loftus claimed that MI6 intervened to protect Aswat while he was trying to evade capture.

Arrest and extradition to the United Kingdom
Having travelled via Pakistan, Aswat was arrested in Zambia on 20 July 2005. He was deported from Zambia to the UK on 7 August 2005 and arrested on his arrival. Following Aswat's capture his family issued a press release, stating that Aswat "has not lived at this house and we have not had contact with him for many years... there is no story that we can provide."

U.S. extradition proceedings
Once Aswat was transferred to the United Kingdom, he was held in detention on a U.S. arrest warrant. American justice officials sought to try Aswat for his alleged role in setting up the Oregon training camp in 1999.

A British judge approved Aswat's extradition on 30 November 2006, discounting the concern Aswat's lawyers expressed that there was "a real risk" Aswat would face inhumane treatment in U.S. custody. But in 2008 he was transferred to Broadmoor Hospital, a high-security psychiatric hospital after being diagnosed with paranoid schizophrenia.

In 2010 the European Court of Human Rights blocked the extradition orders of Aswat, Abu Hamza, Babar Ahmad and Syed Talha Ahsan.

On 16 April 2013, the European Court of Human Rights decided that Aswat's extradition to the U. S. would violate his right for protection against inhumane treatment, given his mental state. The UK Government appealed for the case to be reconsidered by the court's Grand Chamber, but on 11 September 2013 that was rejected, making the decision become final that Aswat cannot now be extradited.

References

External links
As 3 Nations Consulted, Terror Suspect Eluded Arrest, The New York Times, 28 July 2005

1979 births
Living people
People from Dewsbury
British Islamists
People with schizophrenia
July 2005 London bombings
British people imprisoned abroad
People detained at Broadmoor Hospital
English people of Gujarati descent
People from Gujarat
British people of Indian descent